Otto II (died 8 November 1111) was a  (Count) of Habsburg and one of the founding members of the Habsburg family. He was the son of Werner I, Count of Habsburg. 

In 1108, Otto accompanied King Henry V on a campaign against Hungary. On his return, in 1111, he was murdered. Otto is presumed to be the first person to adopt the title .

He married Hilla, countess von Pfirt  (died ), with whom he had two children, Werner II and Adelheid.

References

Translated from the German Wikipedia article, :de:Otto II. (Habsburg).

External links
Genealogical information (in German)
Royalty information
:de:Stammliste der Habsburger

11th-century births
1111 deaths
Year of birth unknown
Counts of Habsburg
Swiss nobility